Talking Rock is a town in Pickens County, Georgia, United States. The population is 91.

History
Talking Rock had its start in the early 1880s when the railroad was extended to that point. The community takes its name from nearby Talking Rock Creek. The Georgia General Assembly incorporated Talking Rock as a town in 1883.

Geography
Talking Rock is located at  (34.509557, -84.505175).

Georgia State Route 136 is the main route through the town, and leads east 30 mi (48 km) to Georgia State Route 9 north of Dawsonville, and west 31 mi (50 km) to Resaca along Interstate 75. Georgia State Routes 5 and 515 (Zell Miller Mountain Parkway) pass to the west of the city as a four-lane highway, leading north 15 mi (24 km) to Ellijay and southeast 6 mi (10 km) to Jasper, the Pickens County seat. Atlanta is 66 mi (106 km) south via GA-5/515 to Interstate 575 and Interstate 75. 

Demographics

At the 2000 census, there were 49 people, 19 households and 14 families residing in the town. The racial makeup of the town was 100.00% White.

There were 19 households, of which 21.1% had children under the age of 18 living with them, 68.4% were married couples living together, 10.5% had a female householder with no husband present, and 21.1% were non-families. 21.1% of all households were made up of individuals, and 15.8% had someone living alone who was 65 years of age or older. The average household size was 2.58 and the average family size was 2.93.

Age distribution was 16.3% under the age of 18, 2.0% from 18 to 24, 34.7% from 25 to 44, 28.6% from 45 to 64, and 18.4% who were 65 years of age or older. The median age was 43 years. For every 100 females, there were 96.0 males. For every 100 females age 18 and over, there were 105.0 males.

The median household income was $33,333, and the median family income was $31,875. Males had a median income of $32,250 versus $26,250 for females. The per capita income for the town was $15,780. None of the population and none of the families were below the poverty line.

Notable people
Chandler Smith (born 2002), professional racing driver

References

External links
 Blue Ridge Mountain News
 Local History & Genealogy
  Talking Rock

Towns in Pickens County, Georgia
Towns in Georgia (U.S. state)